The Austrian Chess Federation (German: Österreichischer Schachbund - ÖSB) is the national organisation for chess in Austria. It is based in Graz.

The federation has 15,000 members and since 1981 publishes a chess magazine called Schach Aktiv. The federation organizes the Austrian Chess Championship.

History
It was founded in 1920 with Josef Krejcik as president, but ceased to exist following the annexation of Austria by Nazi Germany. It was refounded in 1946, with Josef Hanacik as president.

Organisation
 President: Christof Tschohl
 Vice president: Friedrich Knapp

References

External links
 

National members of the European Chess Union
Chess in Austria
Chess
1920 establishments in Austria
Sports organizations established in 1920
Chess organizations
1920 in chess